LFGB may refer to:

 Mulhouse–Habsheim Airfield, near Habsheim, France, ICAO airport code LFGB
  in Germany